Charles D. Brown (July 1, 1887 – November 25, 1948) was an American stage and film actor.

Born in Council Bluffs, Iowa, Brown wrote and directed a single short film in 1914. As an actor, he appeared in more than 100 films, stretching from 1921 through his death in 1948. His parallel career on the Broadway stage spanned 1911 through 1937.

Death 
On November 25, 1948, Brown died at the age of 61 in Hollywood, California. He is buried in Valhalla Memorial Park Cemetery in North Hollywood.

Partial filmography

 A Man of Stone (1921) - Lord Reggie
 The Way of a Maid (1921) - Gordon Witherspoon
 Dangerous Curves (1929) - Spider
 The Dance of Life (1929) - Lefty Miller
 Murder by the Clock (1931) - Officer O'Brien (uncredited)
 The Secret Call (1931) - Bob Barnes
 The Road to Reno (1931) - Jim - Bartender at Pussy-Willow Cafe (uncredited)
 24 Hours (1931) - Detective (uncredited)
 Touchdown (1931) - Harrigan
 The False Madonna (1931) - Peter Angel
 Gold Diggers of 1937 (1936) - Hugo
 Thoroughbreds Don't Cry (1937) - 'Click' Donovan
 Algiers (1938) - Max
 Mr. Moto's Gamble (1938) - Editor
 Island in the Sky (1938) - Inspector Whitehead
 Speed to Burn (1938) - Pop Williams
 The Shopworn Angel (1938) - McGonigle
 Barefoot Boy (1938) - Calvin Whittaker
 The Crowd Roars (1938) - Bill Thorne
 Time Out for Murder (1938) - Max - City Editor (uncredited)
 Flight to Fame (1938) - Maj. Loy
 Five of a Kind (1938) - Editor Crane
 Exposed (1938) - Steve Conway
 Up the River (1938) - Warden Harris
 The Duke of West Point (1938) - Doc Porter
 Disbarred (1939) - Jackson
 Inside Story (1939) - J.B. Douglas
 The Ice Follies of 1939 (1939) - Barney
 Mr. Moto in Danger Island (1939) - Col. Thomas Castle
 Tell No Tales (1939) - Police Lt. Brandt (uncredited)
 Charlie Chan in Reno (1939) - Chief of Police King
 Babes in Arms (1939) - Larry Randall (uncredited)
 Smashing the Money Ring (1939) - Parker
 Little Accident (1939) - Jeff Collins
 Kid Nightingale (1939) - Charles Paxton
 City of Chance (1940) - District Attorney (uncredited)
 He Married His Wife (1940) - Detective
 Wolf of New York (1940) - Const. Nolan
 The Grapes of Wrath (1940) - Wilkie
 I Take This Woman (1940) - Police Lieutenant (uncredited)
 Johnny Apollo (1940) - Sergeant Putting Pinch on Mickey and Johnny (uncredited)
 Forgotten Girls (1940) - Editor Linton
 Florian (1940) - New York Police Lt. (uncredited)
 Women in War (1940) - Freddie (uncredited)
 Brother Orchid (1940) - Brother Wren
 Sailor's Lady (1940) - Capt. Roscoe
 Pier 13 (1940) - Police Captain Blake
 Boom Town (1940) - U.S. Marshal Stebbins (uncredited)
 The Leather Pushers (1940) - J.R. Stevens
 The Old Swimmin' Hole (1940) - Doc Elliott
 Santa Fe Trail (1940) - Maj. Sumner
 Maisie Was a Lady (1941) - 'Doctor' in Sideshow (uncredited)
 Tall, Dark and Handsome (1941) - District Attorney
 Ride, Kelly, Ride (1941) - Bob Martin
 Reaching for the Sun (1941) - Johnson
 International Lady (1941) - Tetlow
 The Devil Pays Off (1941) - Capt. Jonathan Hunt
 Glamour Boy (1942) - Martin Carmichael
 Right to the Heart (1942) - Jim Killian
 Roxie Hart (1942) - Charles E. Murdock
 Fingers at the Window (1942) - Inspector Gallagher
 Sweater Girl (1942) - Police Lt. McGill
 Bombardier (1943) - Officer at Briefing (uncredited)
 Destroyer (1943) - Doctor (uncredited)
 A Lady Takes a Chance (1943) - Dr. G.W. Humboldt
 Swing Shift Maisie (1943) - Curtis Glenby (uncredited)
 The Iron Major (1943) - Fordham Official (uncredited)
 Minesweeper (1943) - Cmdr. Lane
 Lost Angel (1943) - Ed Vincent, NY Morning Transcript City Editor (uncredited)
 The Racket Man (1944) - Clark (uncredited)
 The Fighting Seabees (1944) - Capt. Squires (uncredited)
 Up in Arms (1944) - Mr. Campbell
 Jam Session (1944) - Raymond Stuart
 Follow the Boys (1944) - Col. Starret (uncredited)
 Ladies of Washington (1944) - Inspector Saunders (uncredited)
 Secret Command (1944) - James Thane
 Here Come the Waves (1944) - Capt. Johnson (uncredited)
 Having Wonderful Crime (1945) - Mr. Winslow
 Eve Knew Her Apples (1945) - Joe Gordon
 Don Juan Quilligan (1945) - Police Inspector (uncredited)
 Apology for Murder (1945) - Ward McKee
 Sunbonnet Sue (1945) - Father Hurley
 Sing Your Way Home (1945) - Charles 'Woody' Woodrow (uncredited)
 Tomorrow Is Forever (1946) - Immigration Officer (uncredited)
 Just Before Dawn (1946) - Insp. Burns
 Night Editor (1946) - Crane Stewart
 The Hoodlum Saint (1946) - Ed Collner - Chronicle Reporter
 The Bride Wore Boots (1946) - Wells (uncredited)
 The Man Who Dared (1946) - Dist. Atty. Darrell Tyson
 The Strange Love of Martha Ivers (1946) - McCarthy
 In Fast Company (1946) - Father Donovan
 The Searching Wind (1946) - Carter
 Danger Woman (1946) - Inspector Pepper
 The Last Crooked Mile (1946) - Dietrich - Bank President
 Notorious (1946) - Judge (uncredited)
 The Big Sleep (1946) - Norris - the Butler
 The Killers (1946) - Packy Robinson - Ole's Manager
 Wake Up and Dream (1946) - Lieutenant Commander
 Swell Guy (1946) - McHugh (uncredited)
 Smash-Up, the Story of a Woman (1947) - Michael 'Mike' Dawson
 Undercover Maisie (1947) - Captain Mead
 Railroaded! (1947) - Police Capt. MacTaggart
 Merton of the Movies (1947) - Jeff Baird
 The Senator Was Indiscreet (1947) - Dinty
 I Walk Alone (1947) - Police Lt. Hollaran (uncredited)
 On Our Merry Way (1948) - Mr. Sadd
 Let's Live Again (1948) - Psychiatrist
 I Wouldn't Be in Your Shoes (1948) - Inspector Stevens
 In This Corner (1948) - Victor 'Doc' Fuller
 Tulsa (1949) - Judge McKay (uncredited)
 Follow Me Quietly (1949) - Police Insp. Mulvaney (final film role)

References

External links 

 
 

1887 births
1948 deaths
American male film actors
Male actors from Iowa
20th-century American male actors